Mark O'Neill may refer to:

 Mark O'Neill (rugby league) (born 1975), Australian rugby league footballer of the 1990s and 2000s
 Mark A. O'Neill (born 1959), British entomologist and computer scientist
 Mark O'Neill (TV personality) (born 1984), Irish television personality and producer
 Mark O'Neill (cricketer) (born 1959), Australian cricketer